Frederik Vilhelm Tvede (13 May 1826 – 27 November 1891) was a Danish architect.

Biography
Tvede was born in the parish of Trinitatis in Copenhagen, Denmark. 
He was the son of Johan Frederik Tvede and Christine f. Norup. 

He was a student of Gustav Friedrich Hetsch at the  
Royal Danish Academy of Fine Arts. He was employed as a drawing teacher at the Technical Institute (Teknologisk Institut) and worked for Det Classenske Fideicommis.  His son, Gotfred Tvede was also an architect associated with Det Classenske Fideicommis.

Among other projects, Tvede led  the restoration of the  Church of Our Lady (Vor Frue Kirke) at Kalundborg (1867-1871) as well as  Goose Tower  (Gåsetårnet) at Vordingborg Castle (1871). He designed  Humlebæk Church (1868) and Vedbæk Church  (1870-1871).
He was also responsible for the first architect-designed fisherman's cottage in Denmark in the village of Hesnæs; the roofing was later changed by his son in 1919.

Personal life
In 1857,  he married Marie Ostermann. He was the father of architect  Gotfred Tvede  (1863-1947).
In 1871 he became Knight of the Order of Dannebrog. He died during 1891 and was buried at Assistens Cemetery in Copenhagen.

Gallery

References

External links

Vilhelm Tvede entry in the Den Store Danske Encyklopædi 

1826 births
1891 deaths
Architects from Copenhagen
Royal Danish Academy of Fine Arts alumni
19th-century Danish architects
Knights of the Order of the Dannebrog
Burials at Assistens Cemetery (Copenhagen)